Kkonminam (kkot/n [꽃] = flower, minam [미남] = handsome man) has been commonly used in South Korea since the late-1990s to refer to young men who are concerned with personal style and fashion. Although they are sometimes regarded as bishōnen, neither gender or sexual orientation defines the term.

History 
 The Hwarang, or "flower youths" or "flowering knights/gentlemen", were an elite group of male warriors in Silla, an ancient Korean kingdom. Chinese sources referred only to the physical beauty of the "flower boys" who were known for their androgynous good looks. 
The word "kkonminam" is a neologism that was first used to describe "pretty boy characters from girls comics who regularly appeared against backgrounds filled with flowery patterns". The Korean kkonminam concept of soft masculinity originates from the Japanese concept of bishōnen in shōjo manga and anime, but, according to Sun Jung, with more purity, innocence and politeness.

The emergence of kkonminam was a socio-cultural phenomenon associated with the influence of Mandatory Military Service (strong and tall physical appeal) and Japanese entertainment's androgyny such as manga, dramas, beauty products and music (particularly visual-kei rock bands like X Japan and L'Arc-en-Ciel) in the 1990s. Even though Japanese popular culture was officially banned before 1998, Koreans gathered information in a variety of ways, mainly through underground personalized human networks, internet, trips to Japan and piracy. H.O.T., a revolutionary K-pop group, credited for effeminating Korean masculinity, was heavily criticized at the time for borrowing Japanese style. Professor Kim Hyun Mee at Yonsei University attributes this to the growing independence and confidence of Asian women: "[they] can afford to be more selective when choosing a mate."

The National Security Act affected South Korea in the 1990s when restrictions were placed on international imports. Due to the Act, Korea experienced restrictions on television programming. Television companies turned instead to establishing channels such as Mnet in order to broadcast commercial programs such as K-pop. Mnet is a South Korean television music channel that has a variety of talk, game, and live music shows.

In the late 1990s, Kkonminam images became notable in the Korean entertainment industry, glorifying "pretty" boys with smooth, fair skin, silky hair, and a feminine manner. These new images replaced the previous ones of tough and aggressive Korean men in television commercials, dramas, and on billboards. The Kkonminam phenomenon is prominent in Korean popular culture; it can be seen in fashion, music, photography, advertising, and television.

Television 

In 2009, a Korean television series called Boys over Flowers (based on Japanese  manga Hana Yori Dango) gained popularity in South Korea and across Asia. The plot follows an average high school girl who gets involved in the life of an arrogant rich boy and his friends. In Boys over Flowers: "the males have childlike and boyish features in contrast to their strong and muscular bodies. The popularity of the show influenced many South Korean men to take their appearance more seriously. An increasing number of South Korean males began applying cosmetics, wearing preppy and cruise-like outfits and sporting traditionally feminine looks, colors, and prints".

Korean boy pop bands 
Crystal S. Anderson, a Cultural Studies research scholar at Longwood University, found a variety of ways in which global fans refer to the unique masculinity of male K-pop groups. One respondent wrote: "I am also really curious about flower boys and the varying expressions of masculinity in Korean boy bands." Another respondent noted: "The first thing that attracted me when I was young is that Korean artists were exceptionally handsome/beautiful and possessed unique style, both in their music and fashion," linking appearance to a certain style.

Hybrid bands
Examples of Korean boy bands that exemplify this phenomenon are 2PM, Highlight, and MBLAQ. These bands draw on elements of "gangster" and hip-hop themes in their performances. The hybridized aspects help the bands appeal to broader audiences. Analysts note that these boy bands display masculinity of both kawaii and kkonminam elements. These boy bands test stereotypical masculinity.

Due to their tough masculine image, 2PM have been nicknamed by local Korean media and netizens as Jimseungdol. On-stage, they showcase theatrical manliness. In performances of "Heartbeat", the title song of their first album, they put on a hyper-masculine, beast-like performance. In the performances, Taecyeon tears off his shirt, Nichkhun symbolically rips out Taecyeon's heart in a brutal manner, and Chan-Sung breathes fiercely while lifting Nichkhun over his head.

See also 
 Aegyo
 Bishōnen
 Hwarang
 Little fresh meat
 Moe
 Ulzzang

References 

Beauty
Effeminacy
Korean words and phrases
Masculinity
Male beauty
Men in South Korea
LGBT culture in South Korea
South Korean popular culture
Terms for men
South Korean youth culture